Alistair Peter Robertson (born 9 September 1952 in Philpstoun) is a Scottish former footballer who played as a central defender.

Career

Robertson joined West Bromwich Albion as an apprentice in July 1968 and turned professional in September 1969. He remained with the club until 1986, making over 500 appearances in the heart of the team's defence and playing under managers such as Alan Ashman, Don Howe, Johnny Giles, Ronnie Allen, Ron Atkinson, Ron Wylie, Nobby Stiles and Ron Saunders. The club spent all but three seasons in the top flight during his playing days. A tough defender, he held in high regard by the club's fans. However, he never won a Scotland cap.

He moved to rivals Wolverhampton Wanderers in 1986 and played for four more years, enjoying back-to-back promotions under the management of Graham Turner and also captaining the side to the EFL Trophy at Wembley in 1988.

After retiring from league football in 1990, he became player manager of non-league Worcester City and later took up the reins at Cheltenham Town. He currently works for a car sales company.

References

External links
 

1952 births
Living people
Scottish footballers
Scottish football managers
English Football League players
West Bromwich Albion F.C. players
Wolverhampton Wanderers F.C. players
Worcester City F.C. players
Cheltenham Town F.C. managers
Worcester City F.C. managers
Association football central defenders
Footballers from West Lothian
People from Philpstoun